Henry Douglas Warden (2 February 1800 – 2 December 1856) was a British Resident of the Orange River Sovereignty from 1848-1852, bought the farm Bloemfontein from Johannes Nicolaas Brits.

He went to the Cape in 1819 and was sent to Natal in 1842, where he participated in the siege of Congela. Four years later he was appointed magistrate of the Transoranje and bought the farm Bloemfontein where he and his family settled. The town later became the City of Bloemfontein.

Family Roots

Tradition dictates that Major Warden was the grandson of an illegitimate son of Prince Charles Edward Stuart, the so-called Young Pretender.

His father, Captain Charles Frederick (Stuart) Warden (1746 - circa 1815) changed the family name to Warden for reasons generally accepted to suggest the decision was made to escape religious persecution.

Wardens's mother, Mary Cooper was the daughter of a rich weaver.

Charles Frederick was a Captain in the Buffs Regiment, stationed at the Tower of London, in which he was buried in 1815.

They had 3 sons, and after Charles Frederick's death in 1815, the Duke of York a relative of Mary Cooper supposedly organised employment for them. Charles Frederick (jnr) first went to India in Civil service and later became a rich merchant in Woolwich, George Horatio became a ship's doctor, and the 19 year old Henry Douglas went to the Cape where he obtained a commission in the Cape Corps. On his arrival at Cape Town in 1820 Major Warden joined the Cape Corps as a standard-bearer. By 1825 he became a Lieutenant and during 1835, after displaying extraordinary courage in the sixth Frontier War, he was promoted to Captain of the Cape Mounted Riflemen. He then built Fort Warden at the Great Kei Way, 7 km south-east of the confluence of the Kei and the Komgha Rivers.

In 1826 he was instructed to cross the Orange River and 20 years later he was appointed British Resident in the territory of the Griqua captain Adam Kok to maintain law and order. Major Warden (D/N 1856 6/9/76 4196) founded the town of Bloemfontein in 1846 on the farm Bloemfontein which he had bought from Dolf Britz at £37,10s. In 1848 Andries Pretorius forced Warden to leave Bloemfontein. But in the same year after the battle of Boomplaats he returned as British Resident of the Orange River Sovereignty. From 1848 to 1852 he laid the foundations of an administration which was later to become a model republic. After the death of his first wife (Antoinette Hugo, by whom he had one son, Henry Douglas jnr), Major Warden married Susanna Elizabeth Minnaar (30/10/1815 Grahamstown - 4/10/1890 Smithfield, D/N OFS M578) ) on 5/7/1834 in Grahamstown.

They had 10 children: 1. Charles Frederick +1900 in a Durban concentration camp, Magistrate of Harrismith, the town Warden was named after him, x Johanna Agnes Adam. They had no children but brought up one of George Horatio's sons William Gustavus. 2. George Horatio *Chelsea London Oct 1839, +1915, transport driver, sailor, later farmer in Ladybrand, x Johanna Lucretia van der Hoven. 3. William Gustavus Douglas *March 1841 Fort Beaufort + 7/12/1922 Ladybrand (death notice MGH 15861), prospector in Barkly-west, x Anna Maria Jacobs (1848 -1890 D/N 1890 6/9/284 1768).

They had 4 daughters, including Johanna Catharina x Jacobus Hercules de la Rey. 4. Edward Minnaar was a Jack-of-all-trades in Griekwaland-west, rebel in the gold war � jailed for 4 years, died insolvent, x Hester Elizabeth Jacobs 5. Stephen Gustavus + 1857, shortly after his father. 6. Mary Susanna +young 7. Eliza Frances + 1836, x Stead 8. Louisa Phillipa Jan 1852 Bloemfontein � Dec 1923 Harrismith, x Carl Wilhelm Kies. 9. Mary Emily *17/2/1856 +1944, x A J Wolhuter in 1857, son of Voortrekker Frans Mathys Wolhuter. 10. Stuart Cooper *1857 in Clocolan, after his father's death. Farmer Mount Margaret, Ladybrand and his wife's names were Margaret Susanna. Major Warden's children were educated in an Afrikaans community and played a very important part in building up the Orange Free State.

His son Charles later became the magistrate of Harri-smith. Three well-known streets in Bloemfontein, namely Charles Street, Henry Street and Eliza-beth Street bear the names of his children up to this day (named after the Royal House of Stuart). Warden sold his farm Douglas Valley outside Bloemfontein after the Declaration of Inde-pendence of the Orange Free State in 1854. After his retirement he lived at George where he died of pneumonia in 1856.

References

British colonial political officers
People from the British Empire
1800 births
1856 deaths